The Thoti are one of the Scheduled tribes of India.  In 1991 there were 3,654 Thoti reported by the census of India.  In 2001 the census figure for Thoti was 2,074.

The Thoti live in Andhra Pradesh primarily in Adilabad district, Warangal district, Nizamabad district and Karimnagar district.

The Thoti speak a dialect of the Gondi language.

Sources
http://www.aptribes.gov.in/html/tcr-studies-eci-thotis.htm
document on Scheduled Tribes in Andhra Pradesh

Scheduled Tribes of India
Social groups of Andhra Pradesh